Andrew Alexis "Lex" Stone (May 19, 1885 – March 22, 1925) was an American football player, a coach of football and basketball, and a politician.

Sewanee
Stone was a prominent tackle for the Sewanee Tigers of Sewanee:The University of the South. At Sewanee he was a member of Phi Delta Theta. Stone was picked as a second-team tackle on Sewanee's All-time football team. He stood some 6'2" and 172 pounds.

1907
Stone was selected All-Southern in 1907. Vanderbilt coach Dan McGugin wrote "Lex Stone, of Sewanee, at left tackle was also an exceptional man. He is strong, fast, heavy and good running with the ball or stopping an opponent who has it. He, too, is a line man of a decade for a SIAA college." He was given honorable mention by Walter Camp.

Tennessee
Stone served as the head football coach at the University of Tennessee for one season in 1910, compiling a record 3–5–1.  He also coached the Tennessee Volunteers basketball team during the 1910–11 season, tallying a mark of 7–9. Stone also served in the Tennessee House of Representatives from 1913 to 1915.

Head coaching record

Football

References

1885 births
1925 deaths
20th-century American politicians
All-Southern college football players
American football tackles
Basketball coaches from Tennessee
Members of the Tennessee House of Representatives
People from Lincoln County, Tennessee
Players of American football from Tennessee
Sewanee Tigers football players
Tennessee Volunteers basketball coaches
Tennessee Volunteers football coaches